This Night Is Still Ours is a 2008  Italian comedy film directed by Paolo Genovese and Luca Miniero.

Cast 
Nicolas Vaporidis as Massimo Cirulli
Valentina Izumi Cocco as Jing Fu
Massimiliano Bruno as Andrea
Ilaria Spada as Maria
Katie McGovern as cute American girl
Maurizio Mattioli as Marco Cirulli
Franco Califano as Franco Cicchillitti
Paola Tiziana Cruciani as Miss Rita
Hal Yamanouchi as Laowang

See also
Movies about immigration to Italy

References

External links

2008 films
Italian comedy films
2008 comedy films
Films directed by Paolo Genovese
Films directed by Luca Miniero
Films set in Rome
2000s Italian-language films